This is a list of electoral divisions and wards in the ceremonial county of Bristol in South West England. All changes since the re-organisation of local government following the passing of the Local Government Act 1972 are shown. The number of councillors elected for each electoral division or ward is shown in brackets.

Unitary authority council

Bristol

Wards from 1 April 1974 (first election 7 June 1973) to 5 May 1983:

Wards from 5 May 1983 to 6 May 1999:

Wards from 6 May 1999 to 5 May 2016:

Wards from 5 May 2016 to present:

Former county council

Avon
Electoral Divisions from 1 April 1974 (first election 12 April 1973) to 7 May 1981:

Electoral Divisions from 7 May 1981 to 1 April 1996 (county abolished):

Electoral wards by constituency

In 2016 Bristol City Council switched to ‘All Out’ elections from the previous ‘Elections in thirds’ for ward councillors. This was designed to move away from the previous system which meant the council switched control from one political party as often as every year. Coinciding with the change of electoral system, was a ward boundary change.

Bristol East
As of 2016
Brislington East, Brislington West, Eastville, Frome Vale, Hillfields, St George Central, St George Troopers Hill, St George West,

Formerly;
Brislington East, Brislington West, Eastville, Frome Vale, Hillfields, St George East, St George West, Stockwood.

Bristol North West
As of 2016:
Avonmouth and Lawrence Weston, Henbury and Brentry, Horfield, Lockleaze, southmead, Stoke Bishop, Weatbury-on-Trym and Henleaze

Formerly:
Avonmouth, Henbury, Henleaze, Horfield, Kingsweston, Lockleaze, Southmead, Stoke Bishop, Westbury-on-Trym.

Bristol South
As of 2016:
Bedminster, Bishopsworth,  Filwood, Hartcliffe and Withywood, Hengrove and Whitchurch Park, Knowle, Southville, Stockwood, Windmill Hill

Formerly:
Bedminster, Bishopsworth, Filwood, Hartcliffe, Hengrove, Knowle, Southville, Whitchurch Park, Windmill Hill.

Bristol West
As of 2016: Bristol West wards are
Ashley, Bishopston and Ashley Down, Central, Clifton, Clifton Down, Cotham, Easton, Hotwells and Harbourside, Lawrence Hill, Redland.

Formerly:
Ashley, Bishopston, Cabot, Clifton, Clifton East, Cotham, Easton, Lawrence Hill, Redland.

See also
List of parliamentary constituencies in Avon
Bristol City Council Ward list

References

 
Bristol
Wards